Adeola Adedokun "Ade" Dagunduro (born May 22, 1986) is a retired Nigerian-American professional men's basketball player.

College career
After playing high school basketball at Inglewood High, Dagunduro then played college basketball at Mt. San Antonio College (2004–05), Antelope Valley CC (2005–07), and the University of Nebraska, where he played with the Nebraska Cornhuskers (2007–09).

Professional career
During his playing career, Dagunduro played with Mitteldeutscher BC of the German League, Leuven Bears of the Belgian League, and Virtus Roma of the Italian League.

Nigerian national team
Dagunduro represented Nigeria at the 2012 Summer Olympics.

External links
Eurobasket.com Profile
Draftexpress.com Profile
Italian League Profile 
College Stats
Nebraska College Biography

1986 births
Living people
Nigerian men's basketball players
American men's basketball players
American expatriate basketball people in Belgium
American expatriate basketball people in Germany
American expatriate basketball people in Italy
American sportspeople of Nigerian descent
Antelope Valley Marauders men's basketball players
Basketball players at the 2012 Summer Olympics
Leuven Bears players
Mitteldeutscher BC players
Mt. SAC Mounties men's basketball players
Nebraska Cornhuskers men's basketball players
Olympic basketball players of Nigeria
Pallacanestro Virtus Roma players
Point guards
Shooting guards
Basketball players from Los Angeles
Inglewood High School (California) alumni
Yoruba people